Bruno Marie-Rose (born 20 May 1965 in Bordeaux) is a retired sprinter from France . He was a member of the French team which set a world record in the 4 x 100 metres relay in 1990 with a time of 37.79 seconds to win the gold medal at the European Championships. He also set a world indoor record for 200 metres in 1987 with a time of 20.36 seconds to win the gold medal at the European Indoor Championships. He earned a silver medal at the 1991 World Championships and a bronze medal at the 1988 Olympic Games as a member of French 4 × 100 m relay teams.

Biography

In 1987, Marie-Rose set a world indoor record of 20.36 seconds in the 200 m to win the gold medal at the European Indoor Championships in Liévin. (The time was subsequently bettered, however it remains the French national indoor record.) Marie-Rose also won the 200 m silver medal at the 1987 World Indoor Championships in Indianapolis.

At the 1988 Summer Olympics in Seoul, Marie-Rose won a bronze medal in the 4 × 100 m relay with his teammates Gilles Quénéhervé, Daniel Sangouma and Max Morinière. Marie-Rose also reached the final of the 200 m at the games, finishing in eighth place.

At the 1990 European Championships in Split, the French 4 × 100 m relay team of Morinière, Sangouma, Jean-Charles Trouabal and Marie-Rose set a world record of 37.79 seconds to win the gold medal. (The record was bettered the following year by the Santa Monica Track Club from the United States.) Marie-Rose also reached the final of the 100 metres at the championships, where he finished fourth.

At the 1991 World Championships in Tokyo, Marie-Rose was a member of the French team which won the silver medal in the 4 × 100 m relay.

Marie-Rose is a former French indoor record holder over 60 metres with a time of 6.56 seconds.

International competitions

1Did not finish in the final

References
 

1965 births
Living people
French male sprinters
French people of Martiniquais descent
Athletes (track and field) at the 1984 Summer Olympics
Athletes (track and field) at the 1988 Summer Olympics
Athletes (track and field) at the 1992 Summer Olympics
Olympic athletes of France
Olympic bronze medalists for France
Sportspeople from Bordeaux
World Athletics Championships medalists
European Athletics Championships medalists
Medalists at the 1988 Summer Olympics
Olympic bronze medalists in athletics (track and field)
Universiade medalists in athletics (track and field)
Mediterranean Games gold medalists for France
Mediterranean Games medalists in athletics
Athletes (track and field) at the 1993 Mediterranean Games
Universiade bronze medalists for France
World Athletics Indoor Championships medalists
Medalists at the 1987 Summer Universiade